Albert Cornelius Freeman Jr. (March 21, 1934 – August 9, 2012) was an American actor, director, and educator. A life member of The Actors Studio, Freeman appeared in a wide variety of plays, ranging from Leroi Jones' Slave/Toilet to Joe Papp's revivals of Long Day's Journey Into Night and Troilus and Cressida, and films, including My Sweet Charlie, Finian's Rainbow, and Malcolm X, as well as television series and soap operas, such as One Life to Live, The Cosby Show, Law & Order, Homicide: Life on the Street and The Edge of Night.

Life and career
Al Freeman was born in San Antonio, Texas, to Lottie Brisette (née Coleman) and Albert Cornelius Freeman, a jazz pianist. Taking a hiatus from college, Freeman enlisted in the Air Force in 1951 to serve in the Korean War.

He starred opposite Frank Sinatra in the 1968 Gordon Douglas film The Detective, before taking his most recognized acting role as police captain Ed Hall on the ABC soap opera One Life to Live from 1972 through 1987, with recurring appearances in 1988 and 2000.  He won a Daytime Emmy Award for Outstanding Lead Actor for that role in 1979, the first actor from the show as well as the first African-American actor to earn the award.

After leaving One Life to Live, Freeman appeared in the 1998 motion picture Down in the Delta. His Broadway theatre credits include The Hot L Baltimore and Look to the Lilies. His portrayal of Elijah Muhammad, the Nation of Islam leader, in the film Malcolm X earned him the 1992 NAACP Image Award for Outstanding Supporting Actor in a Motion Picture. He had played Malcolm X in the 1979 miniseries, Roots: The Next Generations. In the 1990s he had a recurring guest role as the manipulative Baltimore deputy police commissioner James Harris in Homicide: Life on the Street. In 1991 Freeman joined the Department of Theatre Arts at Howard University in Washington, D.C., and served for six years as department chairman.

Al Freeman Jr. also appeared on Broadway in 1970 as Homer Smith in Look to the Lilies, a musical adaptation of Lilies of the Field, opposite Shirley Booth. The show ran for 25 performances and 31 previews.

Death
Freeman died on August 9, 2012, in Washington, D.C., at the age of 78.

On September 10, 2012, a memorial service was held for Freeman at Howard University. In 2014, the Environmental Theatre Space at the Howard University Fine Arts Building was renamed The Al Freeman Jr. Environmental Theatre Space in his honor.

Selected filmography

Film

Television

References

External links
 
  
 
 
  

1934 births
2012 deaths
Place of death missing
20th-century American male actors
African-American male actors
American male film actors
American male soap opera actors
Daytime Emmy Award winners
Daytime Emmy Award for Outstanding Lead Actor in a Drama Series winners
Howard University faculty
Male actors from San Antonio
20th-century African-American people
21st-century African-American people